The Spenders is a 1921 American silent comedy film directed by Jack Conway and starring Claire Adams, Robert McKim and Joseph J. Dowling.

Plot

Cast
 Claire Adams as Avice Milbrey 
 Robert McKim as Rulon Shepler 
 Joseph J. Dowling as Uncle Peter Bines 
 Niles Welch as P. Percival Bines 
 Betty Brice as Psyche Bines 
 Adele Farrington as Mrs. Bines 
 Virginia Harris as Mrs. Ashelstane 
 Tom Ricketts as Mr. Milbrey 
 Otto Lederer as Abe Trummel 
 Harold Holland as Lord Mauburn

References

Bibliography
 Goble, Alan. The Complete Index to Literary Sources in Film. Walter de Gruyter, 1999.

External links

1921 films
1921 comedy films
Silent American comedy films
Films directed by Jack Conway
American silent feature films
1920s English-language films
Pathé Exchange films
American black-and-white films
1920s American films
Films with screenplays by Richard Schayer